Mary Parent (born 1968) is an American film producer, and former studio executive. In February 2011, she co-founded Disruption Entertainment, a company with a first-look deal at Paramount Pictures.  She was formerly the  Chairperson of Metro Goldwyn Mayer's Worldwide Motion Picture Group.  She was a former President of Production for Universal Studios. There, she was responsible for Meet the Fockers, The Bourne Supremacy, Serenity, and other films. In 2004, Parent and Scott Stuber were named Vice Chairman of Worldwide Production for Universal Pictures. In 2005, Universal inked a production deal with the duo under the shingle Stuber/Parent Productions. Under Stuber/Parent, she has produced such films as Role Models (2008), Welcome Home Roscoe Jenkins (2008), The Kingdom (2007), and You, Me and Dupree (2006).  She produced Guillermo del Toro's Pacific Rim, the Darren Aronofsky epic Noah and The SpongeBob Movie: Sponge Out of Water (2015). Parent worked at New Line Cinema in the 1990s.

In 2008, Parent placed 28th on The Wall Street Journals "50 Women to Watch 2008" list.

Filmography
She was a producer in all films unless otherwise noted.

Film

Production manager

References

External links

Mary Parent - Variety, 2001
Stuber and Parent birth a producing deal, 2005
Parent Bio at Universal Studios

American film producers
American film studio executives
American women in film
1968 births
Living people
Metro-Goldwyn-Mayer executives
Universal Pictures
American women film producers
NBCUniversal people
Filmmakers who won the Best Film BAFTA Award